Frederick Renz  is a conductor, director, and keyboardist specializing in Early Music spanning the medieval through the classical eras.  He is the founder of the Early Music Foundation and directs its performing group Early Music New York, an internationally performing ensemble and artist in residence at the Cathedral of St. John the Divine in New York City. Renz is also noted for his work in medieval drama, and has directed and produced works such as Daniel and the Lions and Le Roman de Fauvel based largely on his own musicological research.

Education
Renz received his undergraduate degree in piano performance at State University of New York at Fredonia.  He completed a masters in harpsichord performance at Indiana University, where he also completed course work for a doctorate in conducting with Willi Apel and Julius Herford. In 1962 he received a Fulbright grant to study in the Netherlands with eminent harpsichordist and scholar Gustav Leonhardt at the Amsterdam Conservatory.

Career
Renz performed as a keyboard soloist with New York Pro Musica for six seasons and founded the Early Music Foundation when it disbanded in 1974.  
He continues to direct Early Music New York and frequently plays keyboard instruments in its performances.  Many of these performances, including his recreations of medieval dramas, have been commissioned by the Metropolitan Museum of Art.  He has also directed a large catalogue of recordings with Early Music New York released by the Early Music Foundation's Ex Cathedra Records.  In addition to his work directing Early Music New York, Renz has given many solo performances on harpsichord, appeared in numerous chamber groups and orchestras, and recorded for Nonesuch, Lyrichord, Foné, Decca, Vanguard, and the Musical Heritage Society.  He is also interested in music peripheral to the canon of French, German, English, and Italian music, and has been instrumental in reviving overlooked works from Eastern Europe, Latin America, and Colonial North America.

References

External links
 https://www.earlymusicny.org/emny.php

American performers of early music
Living people
American male conductors (music)
21st-century American conductors (music)
21st-century American male musicians
Year of birth missing (living people)